Kerry Cash (born August 7, 1969 in San Antonio, Texas) is a former American football tight end in the National Football League. He was drafted by the Indianapolis Colts in the fifth round of the 1991 NFL Draft. He played college football at the University of Texas.

Kerry also played for the Oakland Raiders and Chicago Bears.

College career
Cash played tight end while at Texas.

Personal
His twin brother Keith Cash played with him at Texas, and he also played in the NFL.
Since 2012, Kerry Cash has worked as a Precious Metals Specialist with the United States Gold Bureau in Austin, Texas. He has three sons. His eldest son, Isaiah, is on the football and track team at Houston Baptist University.

References

1969 births
Living people
Players of American football from San Antonio
American football tight ends
Texas Longhorns football players
Indianapolis Colts players
Oakland Raiders players
Chicago Bears players